Patrick Joseph Sullivan (March 24, 1854 – February 26, 1896) was professional baseball manager for a period of three games for the Columbus Solons of the American Association.  During this period, his team won two games and lost one.  He replaced Al Buckenberger, and Gus Schmelz replaced Sullivan, and remained their manager until the team folded following the 1891 season.

Sullivan died in Columbus, Ohio at the age of 41.

References

External links
Baseball Reference – Career Managerial Statistics

1854 births
1896 deaths
Columbus Solons managers
People from Lewisburg, West Virginia